{{Infobox Parliament
|name              = The Knesset
|native_name       = 
|transcription_name= HaKnesset
|legislature       = 25th Knesset
|coa_pic           = Emblem_of_Israel_alternative_blue-gold.svg
|session_room      = PikiWiki Israel 7260 Knesset-Room.jpg
|coa_res           = 100px
|house_type        = Unicameral
|leader1_type      = Speaker
|leader1           = Amir Ohana
|party1            = Likud
|election1         = 29 December 2022
|leader2_type      = Prime Minister
|leader2           = Benjamin Netanyahu
|party2            = Likud
|election2         = 29 December 2022
|leader3_type      = Leader of the Opposition
|leader3           = Yair Lapid 
|party3            = Yesh Atid 
|election3         = 2 January 2023
|last_election1    = 1 November 2022
|next_election1    = TBD
|voting_system1    = Closed list proportional representationD'Hondt method
|members           = 120
|structure1        = Composition 25th Knesset.svg
|structure1_res    = 250px
| political_groups1  = Government (64)
  Likud (32)
  Shas (11)
  Religious Zionist (7)
 
  Otzma Yehudit (6)
  Noam (1)Opposition (56)  Yesh Atid (24)
  National Unity (12)
  Yisrael Beiteinu (6)
  United Arab List (5)
  Hadash–Ta'al (5)
  Labor (4)
|meeting_place     = Knesset, Givat Ram, Jerusalem
|website           = 
}}

The Knesset ("gathering" or "assembly") is the unicameral legislature of Israel. As the supreme state body, the Knesset is sovereign and thus has complete control of the entirety of the Israeli government (with the exception of checks and balances from the courts and local governments).

The Knesset passes all laws, elects the president and prime minister (although the latter is ceremonially appointed by the President), approves the cabinet, and supervises the work of the government, among other things. In addition, the Knesset elects the state comptroller. It also has the power to waive the immunity of its members, remove the president and the state comptroller from office, dissolve the government in a constructive vote of no confidence, and to dissolve itself and call new elections. The prime minister may also dissolve the Knesset. However, until an election is completed, the Knesset maintains authority in its current composition. The Knesset meets in Givat Ram, Jerusalem.

Name
The term "Knesset" is derived from the ancient Knesset HaGdola or "Great Assembly", which according to Jewish tradition was an assembly of 120 scribes, sages, and prophets, in the period from the end of the Biblical prophets to the time of the development of Rabbinic Judaism – about two centuries ending c. 200 BCE. There is, however, no organisational continuity and aside from the number of members, there is little similarity, as the ancient Knesset was a religious, completely unelected body.

Members
Members of the Knesset are known in Hebrew as חֲבֵר הַכְּנֶסֶת (Haver HaKnesset), if male, or חַבְרַת הַכְּנֶסֶת (Havrat HaKnesset), if female.

Role in Israeli government
As the legislative branch of the Israeli government, the Knesset passes all laws, elects the president, approves the cabinet, and supervises the work of the government through its committees. It also has the power to waive the immunity of its members, remove the president and the State Comptroller from office, and to dissolve itself and call new elections.

The Knesset has de jure parliamentary supremacy, and can pass any law by a simple majority, even one that might arguably conflict with the Basic Laws of Israel, unless the basic law includes specific conditions for its modification; in accordance with a plan adopted in 1950, the Basic Laws can be adopted and amended by the Knesset, acting in its capacity as a Constituent Assembly. The Knesset itself is regulated by a Basic Law called "Basic Law: the Knesset".

In addition to the absence of a formal constitution, and with no Basic Law thus far being adopted which formally grants a power of judicial review to the judiciary, the Supreme Court of Israel has since the early 1990s asserted its authority, when sitting as the High Court of Justice, to invalidate provisions of Knesset laws it has found to be inconsistent with Basic Law. The Knesset is presided over by a Speaker and Deputy Speakers, called the Knesset Presidium, which currently consists of:

Committees

Knesset committees amend bills on various appropriate subjects. 
Knesset members are assigned to
committees, while chairpersons are chosen by their members, on recommendation of the House Committee, and their factional composition represents that of the Knesset itself. Committees may elect sub-committees and delegate powers to them, or establish joint committees for issues concerning more than one committee. To further their deliberations, they invite non-voting people, like government ministers, senior officials, and experts in the matter being discussed. Committees may request explanations and information from any relevant ministers in any matter within their competence, and the ministers or persons appointed by them must provide the explanation or information requested.

There are four types of committees in the Knesset. Permanent committees amend proposed legislation dealing with their area of expertise, and may initiate legislation. However, such legislation may only deal with Basic Laws and laws dealing with the Knesset, elections to the Knesset, Knesset members, or the State Comptroller. Special committees function in a similar manner to permanent committees, but are appointed to deal with particular manners at hand, and can be dissolved or turned into permanent committees. Parliamentary inquiry committees are appointed by the plenum to deal with issues viewed as having special national importance. In addition, there are two types of committees that convene only when needed: the Interpretations Committee, made up of the Speaker and eight members chosen by the House Committee, deals with appeals against the interpretation given by the Speaker during a sitting of the plenum to the Knesset rules of procedure or precedents, and Public Committees, established to deal with issues that are connected to the Knesset.Knesset Committees. Knesset.gov.il. Retrieved 8 September 2011.Permanent committees:House Committee
Finance Committee
Economic Affairs Committee
Foreign Affairs and Defense Committee
Interior and Environment Committee
Immigration, Absorption, and Diaspora Affairs Committee
Education, Culture, and Sports Committee
Constitution, Law, and Justice Committee
Labour, Welfare, and Health Committee
Science and Technology Committee
State Control Committee
Committee on the Status of WomenSpecial committees:'Committee on Drug Abuse
Committee on the Rights of the Child
Committee on Foreign Workers
Israeli Central Elections Committee
Public Petitions Committee

The other committees are the Arrangements Committee and the Ethics Committee. The Ethics Committee is responsible for jurisdiction over Knesset members who violate the rules of ethics of the Knesset, or are involved in illegal activities outside the Knesset. Within the framework of responsibility, the Ethics Committee may place various sanctions on a member, but is not allowed to restrict a member's right to vote. The Arrangements Committee proposes the makeup of the permanent committees following each election, as well as suggesting committee chairs, lays down the sitting arrangements of political parties in the Knesset, and the distribution of offices in the Knesset building to members and parties.

Caucuses
Knesset members often join in formal or informal groups known as "lobbies" or "caucuses", to advocate for a particular topic. There are hundreds of such caucuses in the Knesset. The Knesset Christian Allies Caucus and the Knesset Land of Israel Caucus are two of the largest and most active caucuses.

Size

The Knesset numbers 120 members, after the size of the Great Assembly. The subject of Knesset membership has often been a cause for proposed reforms. Under the Norwegian Law, Knesset members who are appointed to ministerial positions are allowed to resign and allow the next person on their party's list to take their seat. If they leave the cabinet, they are able to return to the Knesset to take the place of their replacement.

Elections

The 120 members of the Knesset (MKs) are popularly elected from a single nationwide electoral district to concurrent four-year terms, subject to calls for early elections (which are quite common). All Israeli citizens 18 years or older may vote in legislative elections, which are conducted by secret ballot.

Knesset seats are allocated among the various parties using the D'Hondt method of party list proportional representation. A party or electoral alliance must pass the election threshold of 3.25% of the overall vote to be allocated a Knesset seat. Parties select their candidates using a closed list. Thus, voters select the party of their choice, not any specific candidate.

The electoral threshold was previously set at 1% from 1949 to 1992, then 1.5% from 1992 to 2003, and then 2% until March 2014 when the current threshold of 3.25% was passed (effective with elections for the 20th Knesset). As a result of the low threshold, a typical Knesset has 10 or more factions represented. With so many parties, it is nearly impossible for one party or faction to govern alone, let alone win a majority. No party or faction has ever won the 61 seats necessary for a majority; the closest being the 56 seats won by the Alignment in the 1969 elections (the Alignment had briefly held 63 seats going into the 1969 elections after being formed shortly beforehand by the merger of several parties, the only occasion on which any party or faction has ever held a majority). Every Israeli government has been a coalition of two or more parties.

After an election, the president meets with the leaders of every party that won Knesset seats and asks them to recommend which party leader should form the government. The president then nominates the party leader who is most likely to command the support of a majority in the Knesset (though not necessarily the leader of the largest party/faction in the chamber). The prime minister-designate has 42 days to put together a viable coalition (extensions can be granted and often are), and then must win a vote of confidence in the Knesset before taking office.

The following is a list of Knesset elections:

 1949 Israeli Constituent Assembly election
 1951 Israeli legislative election
 1955 Israeli legislative election
 1959 Israeli legislative election
 1961 Israeli legislative election
 1965 Israeli legislative election
 1969 Israeli legislative election
 1973 Israeli legislative election
 1977 Israeli legislative election
 1981 Israeli legislative election
 1984 Israeli legislative election
 1988 Israeli legislative election
 1992 Israeli legislative election
 1996 Israeli general election
 1999 Israeli general election
 2003 Israeli legislative election
 2006 Israeli legislative election
 2009 Israeli legislative election
 2013 Israeli legislative election
 2015 Israeli legislative election
 April 2019 Israeli legislative election
 September 2019 Israeli legislative election
 2020 Israeli legislative election
 2021 Israeli legislative election
 2022 Israeli legislative election

Current composition

The table below lists the parliamentary factions represented in the 25th Knesset.

Historical composition

Functioning
Despite numerous motions of no confidence being tabled in the Knesset, a government has only been defeated by one once, when Yitzhak Shamir's government was brought down on 15 March 1990 as part of a plot that became known as "the dirty trick" (Hebrew: התרגיל המסריח, HaTargil HaMasriaḥ, lit. "the stinking trick").

However, several governments have resigned as a result of no-confidence motions, even when they were not defeated. These include the fifth government, which fell after Prime Minister Moshe Sharett resigned in June 1955 following the abstention of the General Zionists (part of the governing coalition) during a vote of no-confidence; the ninth government, which fell after Prime Minister Ben-Gurion resigned in January 1961 over a motion of no-confidence on the Lavon Affair; and the seventeenth government, which resigned in December 1976 after the National Religious Party (part of the governing coalition) abstained in a motion of no-confidence against the government.

History
Timeline: institution and building

14 February 1949: First meeting of the Constituent Assembly, Jewish Agency, Jerusalem
16 February 1949: Name "Knesset" approved for the Constituent Assembly; number of members fixed at 120; the Knesset starts convening in Tel Aviv (first as at what is now the Opera Tower, later at the San Remo Hotel in Tel Aviv)
26 December 1949 – 8 March 1950: Knesset moved to Jerusalem; first convened at the Jewish Agency building
13 March 1950: Knesset moved to the Froumine House, in King George Street, Jerusalem
1950–1955: Israeli government holds architectural competitions for the permanent Knesset building. Ossip Klarwein's original design won the competition
1955: Government approves plans to build the Knesset in its current location
1957: James de Rothschild informs Prime Minister David Ben-Gurion of his desire to finance the construction of the building
14 October 1958: Cornerstone-laying for new Knesset building
30 August 1966: Dedication of new building (during the sixth Knesset)
1981: Construction of new wing begins
1992: New wing opens
2001: Construction starts on a large new wing that essentially doubles the overall floorspace of the Knesset compound.
2007: New large wing opens

Parliamentary beginnings
The Knesset first convened on 14 February 1949 in Tel Aviv following the 20 January elections, replacing the Provisional State Council which acted as Israel's official legislature from its date of independence on 14 May 1948 and succeeding the Assembly of Representatives that had functioned as the Jewish community's representative body during the Mandate era.

Provisional housing before 1966

Before the construction of its current location, the Knesset met in Tel Aviv, before moving to the Froumine building in Jerusalem.

Permanent building
The Knesset compound sits on a hilltop in western Jerusalem in a district known as Sheikh Badr before the 1948 Arab–Israeli War, now Givat Ram. The main building was financed by James de Rothschild as a gift to the State of Israel in his will and was completed in 1966. It was built on land leased from the Greek Orthodox Patriarchate of Jerusalem. Over the years, significant additions to the structure were constructed, however, these were built at levels below and behind the main 1966 structure as not to detract from the original assembly building's appearance.

Knesset assemblies
Each Knesset session is known by its election number. Thus the Knesset elected by Israel's first election in 1949 is known as the First Knesset''. The current Knesset, elected in 2021, is the Twenty-fourth Knesset.

1st (1949–1951)
2nd (1951–1955)
3rd (1955–1959)
4th (1959–1961)
5th (1961–1965)
6th (1965–1969)
7th (1969–1974)
8th (1974–1977)
9th (1977–1981)
10th (1981–1984)
11th (1984–1988)
12th (1988–1992)
13th (1992–1996)
14th (1996–1999)
15th (1999–2003)
16th (2003–2006)
17th (2006–2009)
18th (2009–2013)
19th (2013–2015)
20th (2015–2019)
21st (2019)
22nd (2019–2020)
23rd (2020–2021)
24th (2021–2022)
25th (2022–)

Tourism
The Knesset holds morning tours in Hebrew, Arabic, English, French, Spanish, German, and Russian on Sunday and Thursday, and there are also live session viewing times on Monday, Tuesday, and Wednesday mornings.

Security

The Knesset is protected by the Knesset Guard, a protective security unit responsible for the security of the Knesset building and Knesset members. Guards are stationed outside the building to provide armed protection, and ushers are stationed inside to maintain order. The Knesset Guard also plays a ceremonial role, participating in state ceremonies, which includes greeting dignitaries on Mount Herzl on the eve of Israeli Independence Day.

Public perception
A poll conducted by the Israeli Democracy Institute in April and May 2014 showed that while a majority of both Jews and Arabs in Israel are proud to be citizens of the country, both groups share a distrust of Israel's government, including the Knesset. Almost three quarters of Israelis surveyed said corruption in Israel's political leadership was either "widespread or somewhat prevalent". A majority of both Arabs and Jews trusted the Israel Defense Forces, the President of Israel, and the Supreme Court of Israel, but Jews and Arabs reported similar levels of mistrust, with little more than a third of each group claiming confidence in the Knesset.

See also

 Great Assembly
 Elections in Israel
 Politics of Israel
 Knesset Guard
 List of Arab members of the Knesset
 Lists of Knesset members
 List of Knesset speakers
 List of legislatures by country

Notes

References

External links
 

 
1949 establishments in Israel
Buildings and structures in Jerusalem
Legislative branch of Israel
Israel
Israel
Israel
Seats of national legislatures
Hebrew words and phrases